Decoy is a 1946 American film noir starring Jean Gillie, Edward Norris, Robert Armstrong, Herbert Rudley, and Sheldon Leonard.  Directed by Jack Bernhard, it was produced by he and Bernard Brandt as a Jack Bernhard Production, with a screenplay by Nedrick Young based on an original story by Stanley Rubin.

Short-lived Jean Gillie, the wife of Jack Bernhard at the time, played the femme fatale central to the picture's story.

Plot
Glamorous Margot Shelby lies dying from a gunshot wound in her San Francisco apartment. Police detective Joe Portugal arrives at the scene just seconds too late to prevent the shooting but still in time to get a possible confession. Margot then recounts the events that led to Dr. Lloyd Craig letting her have it her shortly after arriving at her apartment. 

It all started when Margot's boyfriend gangster Frankie Olins robbed an armored car and got away with $400,000. Before being captured by police he hid the money in a safe place.  Having killed a guard in the holdup, he'd been sentenced to death in the gas chamber.  He trusts no-one and intends to take the secret of where the money is with him.

In order to get Frankie out of prison and her hands on his stash the curvy Margot pretends to be still in love with Frankie while intimate with another gangster, Jim Vincent. Vincent has already been lured into spending a huge wad funding Frankie's defense and lost that gamble. Margot promises to split the take with Vincent 50-50 if she can still get Frankie to disclose the location.  Her new plan is to resuscitate him after he's been gassed at San Quinen by counteracting the effects of the lethal hydrogen cyanide with a chemical known as methylene blue. She seduces the prison physician Dr. Lloyd Craig into helping, who dreams of a better life (and practice) with her to come.

After the execution Craig tricks his assistants into skipping the required autopsy. The body is then waylaid by a bribed hearse driver, who is double-crossed by Vincent, stabbed to death, and Frankie's corpse hijacked by Vincent and his men.

Back at Craig's office the revivication process is completed and a shocked but wary Frankie draws a map to the location of the buried loot for Margot, who is anxious to go recover it.  Ensuring he is not cut out of his share, he tears the map down the middle and keeps one half.  Vincent becomes unnerved when Frankie insists on a kiss from a reluctant Margot and shoots him point blank, killing him for good.  Craig unravels when he discovers Margot and Vincent in an immediate clutch smooching.

When Sergeant Portugal learns of the abduction of Frankie's body, the skipped autopsy, and its subsequent murderous hijacking, he immediately picks up the trails of the suspects. Seeking to stay ahead of a police dragnet, Margot, Vincent, and a reluctant Craig then make tracks in Craig's car for the loot, buried hours away in the California desert.

En route the threesome encounter a police roadblock, but, held at gunpoint by Vincent, Craig uses his doctor ID to get through. Seemingly in the clear, Margot then eliminates Vincent by running over him while he changed a tire she had intentionally let the air out of.

Continuing to the loot's burial site, she then turns her gun on Craig and forces him to dig it up. She becomes giddy, aroused, and finally wails in ecstasy once she has the strongbox in her hands.  Done with another dupe, she plugs Craig twice and erupts into hysterical laughter at how well everything is going, and leaves him for dead. 

Here the loop is closed and it all becomes clear why a gravely wounded Craig had come to wordlessly hitchhike his way back to LA and plunge straight into Margot's apartment gun blazing, ending up dead on its floor.  As the dying Margot finishes her tale to detective Portugal she implores him to open the strongbox so she can wallow her hands in its money. Drawing her last breaths, she purrs to "Jo-Jo" to come down to her level for once and kiss her.  As he leans forward to she pulls back and laughs haughtily in his face, humiliating him in front of the gathering of police and medics, then dies. 

Portugal opens the box, only to find it filled with scrap paper and a single envelope.  He reads the note inside aloud, which reveals that Frankie knew all along he'd be double-crossed and buried the cache somewhere else.  He enclosed a single dollar bill, sarcastically offered to whoever got that far for their "trouble" trying to screw him out of his loot.

Cast
 Jean Gillie as Margot Shelby
 Robert Armstrong as Frank Olins
 Herbert Rudley as Dr. Craig
 Edward Norris as Jim Vincent
 Sheldon Leonard as Sgt. Portugal
 Philip Van Zandt as Tommy (credited as Phil Van Zandt)
 Marjorie Woodworth as Dr. Craig's nurse
 Carole Donne as Waitress
 John Shay as Al
 Bert Roach as Bartender
 Rosemary Bertrand as Ruth

Reception
New York's PM was positive upon the picture's release: "One thing a good B picture knows—and Decoy is a good B—is how to tell its story....Tell it straight, fast, and simple....Make the motives plain, the characterizations clear....Decoy, and Jean Gillie and Marjorie Woodworth, stick to the rules. Miss Gillie's wicked, Miss Woodward's Florence Nightingale, but their costumes define them alike. Otherwise Miss Gillie, who's after the four hundred grand her first bank robber-killer's meanly stashed away, zings through plenty of direct action tactics, with accompanying double-crosses, before she gets its, and the proper Johnston office wages. It takes her 70 minutes to collect them, but that's only because she's deservedly shot at the beginning of the picture, which then explains why. Well, if ever a girl had it coming to her, that Miss Gillie is the one."

The contemporary Philadelphia Inquirer thought the story "clumsily told, and unrelieved by humor. A quirk ending does not suffice for killing most of the suspense by having the story told in flashback. Herbert Rudley is the most believable of the cast,as the physician whose ideals crash."

Film critic Glenn Erickson liked the film, writing in 2007, "After 1978 Decoy rarely or never appeared on television or in museum screenings. In 2000 the American Cinematheque showed it with the writer of its original story, Stanley Rubin, in attendance. The movie brought the house down with its odd mix of melodrama, hardboiled gimmicks and unrestrained sadism. I thought then that, as far as violence goes, Decoy was to 1946 what Pulp Fiction is to 1994."

Film critic Dennis Schwartz gave the film a mixed review in 2019, writing, "Jack Bernhard directs a darkly atmospheric but disjointed film noir that is rife with plot inconsistencies. The film's main virtue is the sinister performance by British newcomer Jean Gillie as Margot Shelby, who is the nonredeemable femme fatale with a history of using men and even resorting to violence to achieve her ends. Gillie is one of the more cruel femme fatales in film noir lore."

Shown on the Turner Classic Movies show 'Noir Alley' with Eddie Muller on December 3, 2022.

References

External links

 
 
 
 
 
 
  by Glenn Erickson, Stanley Rubin, Dick Cavett, and Molly Haskell

1946 films
1946 crime drama films
American crime drama films
American black-and-white films
Film noir
Monogram Pictures films
Films directed by Jack Bernhard
1940s English-language films
1940s American films